Grimma is a town in Saxony, Central Germany, on the left bank of the Mulde,  southeast of Leipzig. Founded in  1170, it is part of the Leipzig district.

Location

Flooding
The river Mulde flows through the town, a significant section of which is situated in a floodplain. Massive floods in 2002 washed away the old Pöppelmannbrücke bridge and caused significant damage to buildings in the town. In the summer of 2013 there was further flood damage.

Suburbs
 Großbardau (merged with Grimma January 2006)
 Döben
 Hohnstädt
 Höfgen
 Beiersdorf
 Kaditzsch
 Schkortitz
 Naundorf
 Neunitz
 Grechwitz
 Dorna
 Kleinbardau (merged with Grimma January 2006)
 Bernbruch (merged with Grimma 2006)
 Waldbardau (merged with Grimma 2006)
 Nerchau (merged with Grimma 2011)
 Thümmlitzwalde (merged with Grimma 2011)
 Großbothen (merged with Grimma 2011)
 Mutzschen (merged with Grimma 1 January 2012)

History
Grimma is of Sorbian origin and was first documented in 1065. The Margraves of Meissen and the Electors of Saxony often resided at the castle in the town.

The town was chosen as one of three government elite boarding schools, the 'Princely Schools of Saxony', in 1550. The purpose of these schools was to educate future civil servants and to prepare them for further studies at universities which is why a number of historical personalities are biographically related to this rather small town. The Gymnasium St. Augustine still exists today as one of only a few public boarding schools in Saxony.

Grimma was the scene of witch trials between 1494–1701. At least two women were executed as witches.

Due to the town being located at the second main railway line between Leipzig and Dresden (via Meissen), the town developed well in the 19th century.

By 1890 the population had reached 8,957.

The town was affected by heavy flooding in 2013.   Work had by this time started on the construction of flood barriers, but their completion had been delayed by local opposition 

In 2017, the Confessional Evangelical Lutheran Conference held their international, triennial convention in Grimma.

Culture
Grimma has been the site of many historic structures, including a town hall dating from 1442, a famous school (the Fürstenschule) erected on the site of a former Augustinian monastery in 1550, and a school of brewing.

Twin towns – sister cities

Datteln is twinned with:
 Bron, France
 Gezer, Israel
 Leduc, Canada
 Rüdesheim, Germany
 Weingarten, Germany

Notable people
Albert III, Duke of Saxony (1443–1500)
Catherine of Saxony, Archduchess of Austria (1468–1524)
Ernst Otto Schlick (1840–1913), engineer
Georg Elias Müller (1850–1934), psychologist
Erich Waschneck (1887–1970), playwright
Diethard Hellmann (1928–1999), musician
Verena Reichel (born 1945), translator
Ulrich Mühe (1953–2007), actor
Carmen Nebel (born 1956), TV moderator
Olaf Beyer (born 1957), athlete
Matthias Lindner (born 1965), footballer
Torsten Kracht (born 1967), footballer
Jochen Kupfer (born 1969), operatic baritone
Marina Schuck (born 1981), sprint canoer
Ronny Garbuschewski (born 1986), footballer

Gallery

References

External links

Towns in Saxony
 
Leipzig (district)
1170 establishments in Europe
1170s establishments in Germany